The 2016 Adrian Flux British FIM Speedway Grand Prix was the fifth race of the 2016 Speedway Grand Prix season. It took place on 9 July at the Principality Stadium in Cardiff, Wales.

Riders 
For the fifth successive Grand Prix first reserve Fredrik Lindgren replaced Jarosław Hampel, who had injured himself during the 2015 Speedway World Cup and was not fit to compete. The Speedway Grand Prix Commission also nominated Danny King as the wild card, and Robert Lambert and Steve Worrall both as Track Reserves.

Results 
The Grand Prix was won by Antonio Lindbäck, who beat world champion Tai Woffinden, Bartosz Zmarzlik and Greg Hancock in the final. Piotr Pawlicki Jr. had initially top scored during the 20 qualifying heats, but was eliminated in the semi-finals. By finishing second, and scoring 15 points, Woffinden closed the gap on Hancock at the top of the world championship standings to just three points.

Heat details

The intermediate classification

References

See also 
 motorcycle speedway

Great Britain
Speedway Grand Prix
Speedway Grand Prix
Speedway Grand Prix of Great Britain